Dick Welch (30 January 1913 – 17 October 2002) was an Australian rules footballer who played with Essendon in the Victorian Football League (VFL).

Notes

External links 
		

1913 births
2002 deaths
Australian rules footballers from Victoria (Australia)
Essendon Football Club players